Georgi Khristov (born 28 April 1938) is a Bulgarian gymnast. He competed in eight events at the 1960 Summer Olympics.

References

External links
 

1938 births
Living people
Bulgarian male artistic gymnasts
Olympic gymnasts of Bulgaria
Gymnasts at the 1960 Summer Olympics
Sportspeople from Ruse, Bulgaria